The Jungle was a portable game console in development by Panasonic, and announced in October 2010. With a design being roughly similar to a small laptop, it was developed as a portable platform for MMOs and aimed at players who wanted to play online games on the go. The Jungle was also Panasonic's first attempt at creating a handheld console. It was expected to be released in mid-2011, effectively putting it into the eighth generation of gaming along with the Nintendo 3DS and the then-unreleased PlayStation Vita.

The system was to be the second dedicated video game console released by Panasonic, after the 3DO from 1993. In 1997, Panasonic was developing a new console called the Panasonic M2, but the company canceled the project.

On March 1, 2011, Panasonic announced the cancellation of the Jungle, "due to changes in the market".

Games
Four games were announced for the release of the Jungle in October 2010:
Stellar Dawn
RuneScape
Battlestar Galactica Online
World of Warcraft

Features
These were announced features for the Jungle:
D-pad
Touchpad
Full QWERTY keyboard
3.5 mm jack
USB and HDMI ports
Linux OS operating system (unconfirmed)
HD 720p high-resolution display (unconfirmed)

References

External links

 "Panasonic Jungle" - Short lived Jungle news site

Handheld game consoles
Panasonic Corporation brands
Panasonic consoles
Vaporware game consoles
ARM-based video game consoles